The Other Path: The Economic Answer to Terrorism is a book by Peruvian economist Hernando de Soto Polar which describes the informal sector and underground economy of Peru in the 1980s.  The book was a top seller in both Latin America and the United States while also receiving international critical acclaim for its impact on economic growth and development in Latin America.

De Soto discusses the failures of government enforced regulations regarding property rights and how underground economies became a dominating presence in Peru as a result.  In the book, de Soto explains how the rigid bureaucratic barriers and lack of legal structuring caused Peruvian citizens to have "houses but not titles; crops but not deeds; businesses but not statutes of incorporation".  The difficulty for Peruvian citizens to acquire basic property rights forced them to participate and develop its own underground economy.  De Soto's accounts in the book how he and his organization, the Institute for Liberty and Democracy (ILD), solved this unstable situation through expansive reform.

Summary
The first half of the book describes the informal economy present in Peruvian society at the time, how it became established, how it operated, and the results of this economic state.  The second half focuses on the analysis of this system of exchange and how it differed from mercantilism, feudalism, and market economy.  The final chapter offers solutions to the present and future situation in Peru in a variety of ways.

The Other Path illustrates how the poor have become a new class of entrepreneurs and why and how they organize themselves outside the law.  It makes the case that social and political peace will not be possible until all of those who know that they are excluded feel they have a fair chance to achieve the standards of the West. (p. xxi)

Topics

Informal Housing

In the book, De Soto and the ILD discover there were two methods of accessed and gained housing through informal means.  The first is invasion; the second is the illegal purchase of agricultural land through organizations, associations cooperatives. (p. 19)

Gradual and Violent Invasion

De Soto found two types of invasion in the informal housing sector of Peru: Gradual Invasion and Violent Invasion.  Although the term "Invasion" is used, confrontations did not normally occur due to the assemblies of masses of people, social need overriding laws, and preventing original owners from adequately reacting. (p. 23)

Gradual Invasion involved people attempting to settle in areas which were already owned.  A common example of this was agricultural workers develop special relationships with the original owners of the land usually by the workers already being employees or tenants.  The owners were not interested in evicting those already working on the property from also living there.  Over time, more people associated with the workers but not the owners come and settle with them whether through acquiring land, renting it, or simply taking it over.  This process of more and more people settling the land with less and less connection with the original owner until they effectively take over the entire area.  This gradual invasion takes a long time as it requires a mass of people exerting pressure and initiating negotiations with the owners to dissuade them from resisting. (pp. 19–20)

The ILD discovered Violent Invasions began with a group of people meeting together with the intention to obtain housing.  After several meetings to determine suitability of the area and what strategic actions needed to be done to take it, the groups attracted other people to join as to reduce the possibility of confrontation by showing up in masses.  Plans for the distribution and purposing of lots were devised before the actual invasion.  They would feign legitimate attempts to legally acquire land by putting in a formal request through the state bureaucracy, but only so they could discourage police retaliation by indicating their request is merely in the process of being approved.  The invasion takes place at night or in the early hours of the morning, "often on dates of civic anniversary as to take advantage of the reduced ability for rapid response by police" (p. 21).  De Soto notes how the group would arrive in trucks and buses and immediately began to erect dwelling, including the posting of abundant Peruvian flags to promote their acts as social justice and patriotism.  Communal kitchens and child-care centers were created to allow members of the group to dedicate as much time as possible to the invasion in its initial stages.  Defense pickets were made to repel eviction and women and children were put in the front in order to arouse sympathy and make the police look like intimidators.  90% of all violent invasions took place on state-owned territory. Violent Invasions overall were based on free consent of the interested parties and were open to the inclusion of new parties.  De Soto coined the term "Expectative Property Right" to describe the execution of the Invasion Contract, inferring the intention of owning property through extralegal means while attempting to achieve official ownership simultaneously. (pp. 20–23)

De Soto described organizations of informal housing after invasions as 
  
These organizations were always democratic with defined structure and leadership involving an executive body and an assembly or deliberative body.  ILD research found that these informal organizations intent was to protect property and work to increase its value to people by performing duties such as "negotiations with the authorities, preserving law and order, and trying to provide services, to registering the properties in the settlement and administering justice within it" (p. 27).  Procuring public services such as water, sewage systems, power, and routes for transportation were critical responsibilities to these organizations efforts towards increasing property value.  The extralegal assembly acted as courts for addressing criminal activity and resolved property disputes.  Punishments and decisions in these extralegal matters were not written regulations, but rather defined by settlement customs.

Informal Associations and Cooperatives
The alternative to Invasion methods to gain property was through associations and cooperatives.  De Soto found that business professionals are commonly the core of these processes as it required the calculation of significantly complex cost solutions and be able to negotiate to achieve them.  These individuals act as informal real estate brokers, trying to negotiate not just the specific lots of land and their price, but also how to conceal the transaction itself. (p. 32)

Rights of Informal Housing
One of the issues discussed in The Other Path found regarding the "Expectative Property Right" is how it was not granted the same rights as traditional ownership. 
 
The ILD discovered how 

Selling became a difficult process as informals could only transfer ownership of the buildings themselves and not the land they stood on because they didn't own the formal rights to land.  Approval of residents around the settlement was also necessary in the early stages of informal housing transactions.  There were, however, rudimentary registers kept by the informals to record the sale of land which helped strengthen the concept of extralegal ownership.  The requirement of being physically present in settlements for extralegal property rights was also one of the many high costs of living informally, despite the ingenuity of the informal system to facilitate activities. (pp. 25–26)

Informal Trade
Along with Informal Housing, De Soto writes in The Other Path about the Informal Trading which took place in Peru during the 1980s.  De Soto describes two types of Informal Trade: Street Vending and Informal Markets.

Street Vending
Street Vending is defined in the book as

The vast majority of street vending took place in poor neighborhoods.  Part of the appeal of informal trading was the fact that vendors as a whole experienced a net per-capita income 38% more than the minimum legal wage at the time (p. 60).  Street Vending took the form of two different variations, Itinerant Vending and Vending From a Fixed Location.

Itinerant Vendors are mobile merchants who trade small quantities of goods to individuals they come into contact with while on the move.  Their skill and success is dependent on their ability to find buying customers.  It is a primarily individual endeavor with no great physical capital and mostly self-financed through cash transactions.  Vendors create "circuit routes of trade" where they frequent and generate reputation with other vendors, customers, and suppliers (p. 63).

It is the aspiration of these Itinerant Vendors to gain a fixed location of business.  To achieve this, an invasion of land little by little through a complex economic calculation is performed by the formerly mobile merchants.  Groups of vendors will set up shop together in areas of successful business venture to complement each other's goods and services in what the ILD classifies as "belts and minimarkets" (pp. 64–65).  These actors believed fixed locations signals to customers how the vendor should be interpreted as dependable and reputable, both to generate more profit but to also qualify better to creditors.  The ILD found that many of these fixed spots may be worked by multiple businesses throughout the day in appropriate and coordinated shifts (p. 67).  However, these vendors lived under the constant risk of eviction as their activities were not legal and paid between 98% and 495% more per square meter than formal merchants (pp. 68–69).  Self Defense organizations which vendors banded together in mutual aid was necessary to protect their investments and establish informal property rights.

Informal Markets
De Soto discussed informal markets as:

The ILD found that 63% of informal markets were built by street vendor organizations where as only 1 out of 5 markets were built by state authorities (pp. 72–73).  Vendors created Promotional Organizations to raise funds for the actual building of the markets.  It was difficult for informals to obtain credit due to the uncertainty surrounding their illegality and markets took an average of seventeen years to be completed.

Informal Transportation
Informal Transportation, like Informal Housing and Trade, grew out of the failure of state provided institutions and the desire people had to have access to mass transit.  The ILD studied this subject and found that in 1984, Informal Mass Transit made up 91% of all forms of transportation and increased to 95% if adding taxis and rental vehicles (p. 93).  There were two types of Informal Transport, the "collective" or public taxis which was either sedans or station wagons, and minibus which was represented by vans and buses with capacity for dozens of passengers.  Informal Transport operators invade routes based economic calculation, reminiscent of informal housing and trade.  Informal mass transit also develops committees to organize operators into cost effective solutions and negotiate with state authorities.

Statistics
The Other Path includes a significant amount of statistics involving the informal economy and Peru throughout history.

History of Peru
 Between 1940 and 1981 Peru's urban population increased almost fivefold (from 2.4 to 11.6 million). (p. 7)
 The population of the capital city multiplied by 7.6 times during this period.  In 1940 it housed 8.6% of the country's population; it now contains 26% (p. 8)

De Soto and the Institute for Liberty and Democracy History
 From 1984 through 1995, every president of Peru called on the Institute for Liberty and Democracy to help change the country.  Local polls indicated that ILD influence in the nation was surpassed only by the president, the armed forces, and the Catholic Church. (p. xxi)
  Over the next decade, until 1995, the ILD designed rules, procedures, and organizations to help the government listen to its own people.  During that period, the ILD initiated some four hundred major laws and regulation and managed one of the world's largest property creation projects. (p. xxiii)
  On the real estate side, they brought down the administrative time needed to record the property of poor from more than a dozen years to 1 month, and cut the costs by 99%. Some 300,000 owners whose property on average at least doubled in value.  By 2000, some 1.9 million buildings on urban land had entered the legal system. (pp. xxv-xxvii)
 On the business side, they cut the cost of entering business from some 300 days down to one.  By 1994, over 270,000 formerly extra legal entrepreneurs had entered the legal economy, creating over half a million new jobs and increasing tax revenues by US$1.2 billion. (pp. xxvi-xxvii)
 As the farmers switched to legal crops, Peru's participation in the international cocaine market began gradually to descend from 60% to 25%. (p. xxvii)
 To get a marriage license, which used to take 720 hours of bureaucratic hassles, was reduced to 120 hours. (p. xxx)

Peruvian Bureaucracy and the Informal/Extralegal Economy
 The ILD reports that since 1990, 85% percent of all new jobs in Latin American and the Caribbean have been created in the extralegal sector. (p. xxxiv)
 The "extralegal" sector represented the majority of Peruvians at its peak.  It represented 60–80% of the nation's population, constructed seven out of every ten buildings, built and owned 278 out of Lima's 331 markets, operated 56% of all business of the nation, retail of over 60% of foodstuffs, and operated 86% of all buses. (pp. xviii-xviiii)
 48% of the economically active population and 61.2% of work hours are devoted to informal activities which contribute 38.9% of the GDP recorded in the national accounts (p. 12)
 The state operated legal and administrative bureaucracies created substantial lags for Peruvians in this time period.  It took entrepreneurs 13 years to build a retail market for food, 21 years to obtain authorization to construct a legally titled building on wasteland, 26 months to get authorization to operate a new bus route, and nearly a year to gain legal license to operate a sewing machine for commercial purposes. (p. xviiii)
 The total cost of an individual's access to small formal industry is thus $1,231-32 times the monthly minimum living wage (pp. 133–134)

Critical acclaim
United States Senator Bill Bradley referred to The Other Path as "The best way to understand Latin America's problems and issues".  President Bill Clinton, George H. W. Bush, and Richard Nixon were among those who publicly praised the book and de Soto.

References

Informal economy
Economic history of Peru
1980s economic history
1980s in Peru
2002 books